The  Light heavyweight (81 kg) competition at the 2016 AIBA Women's World Boxing Championships was held from 19–27 May 2016.

Draw

Preliminaries

Main draw

References
Draw

Light heavyweight